Zubovići u Oglečevi  is a village in the municipality of Novo Goražde, Republika Srpska, Bosnia and Herzegovina.

Demographics 
According to the 2013 census, its population was 82, all Bosniaks.

References

Populated places in Novo Goražde